Duke of Orléans was a French royal title usually granted by the King of France to one of his close relatives (usually a younger brother or son), or otherwise inherited through the male line. First created in 1344 by King Philip VI for his younger son Philip, the title was recreated by King Charles VI for his younger brother Louis, who passed the title on to his son and then to his grandson, the latter becoming King Louis XII. The title was created and recreated six times in total, until 1661, when Louis XIV bestowed it upon his younger brother Philippe, who passed it on to his male descendants, who became known as the "Orléans branch" of the Bourbons.  

Based at the Palais-Royal, the Duke of Orléans Louis-Philippe II contested the authority of his cousin Louis XVI in the adjacent Louvre. His son would eventually ascend to the throne in 1830 as Louis-Philippe I, King of the French. The descendants of the family are the Orléanist pretenders to the French throne.   

Île d'Orléans, in Canada, is named after Duke of Orléans Henri II, and the city of New Orleans in the United States is named after Duke of Orléans Philippe II.  

The holder of the title held the style of Serene Highness.

House of Valois
The first Dukedom of Orléans was created for Philip of Valois, seventh son of Philip VI of France and younger brother of John the Good, in 1344. This appanage merged the appanages of Touraine and Valois. However, the first ducal line ended with Philip, who died without legitimate children.

House of Valois-Orléans
The second dukedom of Orléans was created in 1392 by Charles VI of France for his younger brother Louis. His role as leading figure in court, regent for his brother during his madness and wealthy landlord, as well as head of the Armagnac party, permitted his descendant to maintain a prominent role in French politics. His grandson Louis XII became king after the extinction of the direct Valois in 1498, while his great-grandson Francis I succeeded the last in 1515. The direct line of Valois-Orléans became extinct with the death of Louis XII in 1515, although the dukedom of Orléans was integrated among the crown's properties after his ascent to the throne in 1495.

House of Valois-Angoulême
The third dukedom of Orléans was created by Francis I for his second son Henry at his birth. When Henry's elder brother and Dauphin, Francis, Duke of Brittany, died childless in 1536, Henry substituted him as Dauphin and ceded the title to his younger brother Charles, Duke of Angoulême, who died childless in 1545.

The fourth dukedom was created by Henry II for his son Louis at his birth. The child duke, however, died one year later, and the title passed to his recently born brother Charles, who became King of France in 1560. The title passed to Charles' brother, Henry, Duke of Angoulême, who six years later exchanged the appanages of Orléans for the Dukedom of Anjou, becoming the heir in pectore of the Crown.

House of Medici
After Henry's exchange of appanages, Charles IX gave the Orléanais to his mother Catherine, former Queen of France, as reward for her role as regent, mainly about toleration politics. She was the only suo jure Duchess of Orléans, so is included among the ruling dukes.

First House of Bourbon-Orléans
The fifth dukedom was created in 1626 by Louis XIII for his younger brother Gaston, Duke of Anjou. Gaston became a libertine and scheming figure at court, plotting the assassination of Cardinal Richelieu and later joining the Fronde, a coalition of nobles who opposed the royal centralisation. Finally forgiven by Louis XIII, he died without male heirs, extinguishing the first Bourbon House of Orléans.

Notes: the Monsieur d'Orléans, second son of Henry IV isn't included in the list due to his short life (4 years) and lack of official baptism or name.

Second House of Bourbon-Orléans

The sixth and final creation was for Philip, Duke of Anjou, who received the Orléanais by his brother Louis XIV. Through his marriage with Elizabeth Charlotte of the Palatinate, he established a long dynasty that finally arose to the throne in 1830, with the deposition of Charles X and the proclamation of Louis Philippe I. Louis Philippe passed his title to his son and dauphin, Ferdinand, who died in a carriage accident in 1842.

Current use
Legitimists recognize Jean, Count of Paris, Head of the House of Orléans, as Duke of Orléans, inheriting the title as the heir male of Philip I, Duke of Orléans.
Orleanists recognize Jacques d'Orléans, uncle of the Count of Paris, as Duke of Orléans. Per Orleanist reckoning, the title has merged with the crown. Jacques is the younger fraternal twin brother of Michel d'Orléans. According to Orleanists, the last of twins to be born is the first-born. Thus, Jacques is considered the eldest uncle of the Count of Paris, whom they consider the king.

See also
 Duchess of Orléans
 Count of Orléans
 Orleanist
 Legitimist
 Dauphin of France
 Duke of York

References

House of Bourbon (France)
 
Duchesses of Orléans